John Blackburne (1787 – 21 April 1837) was a British barrister and politician.

Born in Huddersfield, Blackburne studied at Brasenose College, Oxford.  He became a bencher of the Middle Temple, and a King's Counsel.  He was appointed as Chief Commissioner of the Corporation Inquiry.  He stood in the 1834 Huddersfield by-election as a Whig, winning the seat.  In Parliament, he supported a three-year maximum period between general elections, and opposed the Corn Laws.  He held his seat until his death, in 1837.

References

1787 births
1837 deaths
Alumni of Brasenose College, Oxford
English barristers
People from Huddersfield
UK MPs 1832–1835
UK MPs 1835–1837
Whig (British political party) MPs for English constituencies